Lopadea Nouă is a commune located in Alba County, Transylvania, Romania. It is composed of eight villages: Asinip (Asszonynépe), Băgău (Magyarbagó), Beța (Magyarbece), Cicârd (Csengerpuszta), Ciuguzel (Fugad), Lopadea Nouă, Ocnișoara (Kisakna) and Odverem (Vadverem).

At the 2011 census, 52.5% of inhabitants were Hungarians and 47.1% Romanians. At the 2002 census, 53% were Reformed and 45% Romanian Orthodox.

References

Communes in Alba County
Localities in Transylvania